Carlos Fernández (born 17 February 1992) is a Honduran footballer who plays as a winger for Liga Nacional club Guastatoya.

References

1992 births
Honduran footballers
Living people
Association football forwards
Association football wingers
Cerro Largo F.C. players
F.C. Motagua players
Liga Nacional de Fútbol Profesional de Honduras players
2021 CONCACAF Gold Cup players
People from Tela